Ronald Hampton Douglas Martin (14 September 1904 – 25 June 1984) was an Australian rules footballer who played with South Melbourne in the Victorian Football League (VFL).

Martin was recruited from South Melbourne Districts via Stratford in Gippsland, where he coached in 1929 and debuted for South Melbourne in round nine against Geelong in 1930.

Martin coached Rochester in 1928.

Notes

External links 

1904 births
1984 deaths
Australian rules footballers from Victoria (Australia)
Sydney Swans players